B R Birla Public School is an English medium co-educational school. It was established in 1991 to fulfil the dream of the late Bhopat Ram Birla, the grandfather of the present Birla family. The school is managed by a registered body, Bhopat Ram Birla Shikshan Sansthan, Jodhpur, Rajasthan.

B R Birla Jodhpur
It has residential programs as well as day school.

School facilities include:

 
 
 Conversation classes in the Language Lab,
 Faculty selected by the BRBPS society,
 Day Boarding remedial classes,
 Skating, swimming, and volleyball,

B R Birla Pali
The school is located near Bangur College, Naya Gaon, Pali. This was the second school in the town that got affiliated to the CBSE curriculum.

B R Birla Barmer
The school is located near Rai Colony, Barmer.

External links
 http://www.brbirla.org/index.html

Schools in Rajasthan
Education in Pali district
1991 establishments in Rajasthan
Educational institutions established in 1991
Jodhpur district